The Cypriot Basketball Super Cup is a men's professional basketball competition in Cyprus, organized by the Cyprus Basketball Federation. It is contested by the champion of the Cypriot First Division and the winner of the Cypriot Cup.

History
The first Cypriot Super Cup match was played in 1985, with AEL winning the trophy, after beating ENAD 78–75. From 195 until 1994, the competition was held under the name "Independence Shield", but in the following years it was called, the "Federation Cup". From 2005 until 2009, the competition was dedicated to the memory of the victims of the Helios Airways Flight 522 plane crash, which took place at Grammatiko, in 2005. 

Over the next five years, the competition was called "Marios Papalas' Shield", and since 2015, it is called "OPAP Super Cup". As of today, nine different teams have won the Cypriot Super Cup, with APOEL being the most successful club in the tournament, having won the trophy nine times.

Super Cup winners
The winners of the competition from 1985 until today are:

1985 – AEL
1986 – APOEL
1987 – ENAD
1988 – AEL
1989 – Not held
1990 – Achilleas
1991 – Pezoporikos
1992 – Achilleas
1993 – Achilleas
1994 – APOEL
1995 – APOEL
1996 – Achilleas
1997 – APOEL
1998 – APOEL
1999 – Keravnos
2000 – Keravnos
2001 – APOEL
2002 – APOEL
2003 – AEL
2004 – Apollon

2005 – AEL
2006 – AEL
2007 – AEL
2008 – AEL
2009 – AEL
2010 – APOEL
2011 – ETHA
2012 – Keravnos
2013 – AEK
2014 – APOEL
2015 – AEK
2016 – AEK
2017 – AEK
2018 – AEK
2019 – Keravnos
2021 – Keravnos
2022 – Keravnos

Performance by club

See also
 Cyprus Basketball Division A
 Cypriot Basketball Cup

References

External links
 ΙΣΤΟΡΙΚΟ ΑΠΟΤΕΛΕΣΜΑΤΩΝ ΓΙΑ SUPER CUP ΑΝΔΡΩΝ
 Αφιέρωμα στο Σούπερ Καπ Καλαθόσφαιρας

Basketball competitions in Cyprus
Basketball supercup competitions in Europe
1985 establishments in Cyprus